Fukumura (written: 福村 or 譜久村) is a Japanese surname. Notable people with the surname include:

, Japanese jazz trombonist
, Japanese singer and actress
, Japanese footballer
, Japanese conductor

Japanese-language surnames